From the Beginning is a gospel compilation album by American R&B singer Deniece Williams, released in 1990 on Sparrow Records. It is a collection of gospel songs Williams had recorded during her years at Columbia Records. Williams recorded one gospel song on each of her albums starting with 1976's "Watching Over" from This Is Niecy to her cover of the Michael Jackson Captain EO track "We Are Here to Change the World" from 1988's As Good As It Gets. The album also contains a live performance of "God Is Amazing" from the 27th Annual Grammy Awards, originally from her 1977 album Song Bird. From the Beginning debuted and peaked at number 35 on the Billboard Top Christian Albums chart.

Track listing

Charts

Radio singles

References

1990 albums
Deniece Williams albums
Sparrow Records albums